Maple Ridge, or Maple Ridge/Oak Ridge, is a neighbourhood in southeast Edmonton, Alberta, Canada. A manufactured home community, it is located on the east side of 17 Street NW at 66 Avenue NW. It is surrounded by industrial lands.

Maple Ridge had a population of 1,711 according to Edmonton's 2012 municipal census.

Three out of four of the homes in Maple Ridge (75.2%) were moved into the community during the 1970s, with a small percentage (3.5%) predating 1970.  Most of the remainder were moved into Maple Ridge during the first half of the 1980s.

All the homes in the neighbourhood are manufactured homes.  Owner-occupancy is high, with roughly 96% of homes being owner occupied.

Demographics 

Surrounding neighbourhoods

See also 
 Evergreen, Edmonton
 Westview Village, Edmonton

References

External links 
 Maple Ridge Neighbourhood Profile

Neighbourhoods in Edmonton